"Bam Bam" is a song by Cuban-American singer Camila Cabello, featuring vocals from English singer-songwriter Ed Sheeran. It was released through Epic Records as the second single from Cabello's third studio album, Familia, on March 4, 2022. "Bam Bam" is a Latin pop song with a tropical and salsa-infused pre-chorus and chorus. It marks the second collaboration between Cabello and Sheeran, following the earlier single, "South of the Border" (which also featured American rapper Cardi B), from Sheeran's fourth studio album, No.6 Collaborations Project (2019).

"Bam Bam" reached number five on the Billboard Global 200 singles chart, Cabello's highest peak since the chart's creation in 2020. "Bam Bam" peaked at number twenty-one on the Billboard Hot 100 and peaked inside the top 10 in over 15 countries. In November 2022, the song won the NRJ Music Award for Collaboration of the Year. It was also nominated for Best Pop Duo/Group Performance at the 2023 Grammy Awards.

Release and promotion
On February 6, 2022, Cabello posted a video of her sitting in a car and lip-syncing the lyrics to "Bam Bam".  She announced the song on February 21, 2022, referring to Sheeran as "one of my favorite people and artists ever". The song's cover art sees Cabello sitting on a curb with ruined makeup. Six days later, she shared another snippet on the video-sharing app TikTok, which saw her singing in both English and Spanish. On March 2, Cabello and Sheeran posted a joint teaser on Instagram.

Critical reception
"Bam Bam" received positive reviews from critics. Official Charts Company reviewed the song prior to release calling it "a break up bop" and dubbed the track as "a song of acceptance, hope and happiness". Vulture called it "a bona fide breakup bop". Rolling Stone stated in their review that "Camila Cabello brought the azúcar to all the right places with the release of her salsa-infused "Bam Bam" featuring Ed Sheeran." Billboard described the song as a "gyrating pop number  [that] oozes Latin charm, with a warm tropical breeze blowing through" Katie Bain for Billboard described it as "a really catchy, accessible and breezy song that’s easy to like"

Billboard named "Bam Bam" a contender for song of summer 2022.

"Bam Bam" won the 'International Collaboration of the Year' Award at the NRJ Music Awards of 2022.

"Bam Bam" is also nominated for Best Pop Duo/Group at the upcoming 2023 Grammy Awards, Cabello's fourth nomination, and second in the Best Pop Duo/Group Category.

Commercial performance
In its first week after release "Bam Bam" landed at number 23 on the Billboard Hot 100, and rose in its eighth week to a peak of 21, making it Cabello's 7th highest charting song ever on the Hot 100. Bam Bam became Cabello's eighth top-40 hit on the Hot 100. The song debuted at Number 2 on the US Digital Song Sales chart. Bam Bam peaked at number 8 on the US Pop Airplay chart, Cabello's 8th Top 10 entry and highest since her release of "My Oh My" in 2020. Bam Bam charted for 20 weeks on the BB100 before going recurrent and exiting. 

Bam Bam debuted at number 10 on the Billboard Global 200 marking Cabello's highest entry on the chart, it then rose and peaked at number 5 on the chart, marking Cabello's first top 5 entry.

In the UK, "Bam Bam" debuted on the UK Singles Chart at Number 22, before rising to number 7, marking Cabello's fifth Top 10 entry. In Ireland, Bam Bam peaked at number 4 on the Irish Singles Chart.

In Canada "Bam Bam" debuted at Number 10 on the Canadian Hot 100, before rising to number 4, making it Cabello's 3rd Top 5 hit in Canada. It peaked at number 4 on the Canada AC, and number 2 on Canadian Pop Radio.

In Australia "Bam Bam" debuted at Number 19 on the ARIA Singles Chart, before reaching a new peak of 11, marking Cabello's third-highest charting song in Australia, it remained at number 11 for two consecutive weeks.

Overall "Bam Bam" has reached the Top 10 in 18 countries. "Bam Bam" is currently the 2nd most streamed female lead song released in 2022 on Spotify as of November 2022. It also spent its first 100 days after release inside the top 10 of the iTunes Worldwide Chart. The music platform Deezer announced "Bam Bam" was the most streamed female song of 2022 on the platform, and 3rd most overall.

Awards and nominations 
{| class="wikitable sortable plainrowheaders" style="width: 50%;"
|-
! scope="col" | Year
! scope="col" | Ceremony
! scope="col" | Category
! scope="col" | Result
|-
| rowspan="6"| 2022
| Grammy Awards
|Best Pop Duo/Group Performance
|
|-
|MTV Video Music Awards
|Best Cinematography
|
|-
|Nickelodeon Mexico Kids' Choice Awards
|International Hit of the Year
|
|-
|rowspan=2|NRJ Music Awards
|International Song of the Year
|
|-
|International Collaboration of the Year
|
|-
|People's Choice Awards
|Collaboration of the Year
|

Music video
The music video for "Bam Bam", directed by Mia Barnes, premiered on March 4, 2022. It reached 50M views within the first month. 5 months after release it surpassed 100M views.

As the video starts, Cabello is sitting on a curbside at night, drinking beer and eating ice cream, presumably miserable over the aftermath of the breakup. As the song starts, she then goes into a club called "Life is Beautiful" where a party is going on and dances while dressed up and having fun with the party-goers. Meanwhile, as Sheeran's verse starts, he is sitting at a table and receives a notification that his ride was cancelled, and goes into the same club as Cabello, where he pulls out the guitar and starts playing. As the song progresses, it intercuts with scenes of Cabello walking with her friends, being rolled around in a shopping cart, and in a limousine in the rain. Sheeran playing his guitar is intercut multiple times. The final minute features Cabello and her friends in a laundromat playing with lingerie, then it cuts to the morning where she tosses a striped bucket hat to some patrons and smiles as it cuts to her in another building getting ready to do some yoga as the video ends.

The official lyric video was released on March 10, 2022. A second lyric video was released on April 8, 2022, alongside other lyric videos for the release of Cabello's album Familia.

Live performances
On March 4, the day that "Bam Bam" was released, Cabello performed the song for the first time on The Late Late Show with James Corden. On March 29, Cabello and Sheeran performed the song for the first time together at the Concert for Ukraine benefit concert at Resorts World Arena in Birmingham, where Cabello also performed a cover of "Fix You" by Coldplay. On April 10, Cabello performed a solo performance of the song on Saturday Night Live. On April 12, Cabello performed "Bam Bam" solo on Today, alongside other songs Familia. On May 28, Cabello performed the song in the 2022 UEFA Champions League Final. On June 4 and 5, Cabello performed the song during the Wango Tango and WAZMATAZZ music festivals in California. "Bam Bam" was used in promotional material for Season 22 of The Voice, which Cabello will be a judge for.

"Bam Bam" was performed as part of Cabello's promo TikTok concert: Familia: Welcome to the Family as the closing performance.

Credits and personnel

 Camila Cabello – lead vocals, songwriting
 Ed Sheeran – featured vocals, songwriting
 Ricky Reed – production, songwriting, programming
 Edgar Barrera – production, songwriting, programming
 Cheche Alara – production, songwriting, arrangement
 Scott Harris – songwriting
 Daniel Uribe – miscellaneous production
 Antonio Sol – background vocals
 Carlos Murguía – background vocals
 James Zavaleta – background vocals
 Ramon Stagnaro – guitar
 Carlitos del Puerto – bass
 George Shelby – saxophone
 Harry Kim – trumpet
 Michael Cordóne – trumpet
 Gerardo Rodriguez – trumpet
 Eric Jorgensen – trombone
 Luis Conte – percussion
 Kevin Ricard – percussion
 Manny Marroquin – mixing
 Michelle Mancini – mastering
 Bill Malina – engineering
 Ethan Shumaker – engineering
 James Kirk – engineering assistance
 Logan Taylor – engineering assistance

Charts

Weekly charts

Year-end charts

Certifications

Release history

References

2022 singles
2022 songs
Camila Cabello songs
Ed Sheeran songs
Songs written by Camila Cabello
Songs written by Ed Sheeran
Songs written by Ricky Reed
Songs written by Edgar Barrera
Songs written by Scott Harris (songwriter)
Song recordings produced by Edgar Barrera
Epic Records singles
Syco Music singles